The Men's time trial H4 road cycling event at the 2012 Summer Paralympics took place on September 5 at Brands Hatch. Ten riders from nine different nations competed. The race distance was 16 km. The race was won by former F1 driver Alex Zanardi.

Results

References

Men's road time trial C1